Cumberland is one of the historic counties of England.

Cumberland may also refer to:

Places

Australia
 Cumberland, Queensland, a ghost town west of Georgetown
 Cumberland County, New South Wales, containing most of the Sydney metropolitan area
 Cumberland Council, New South Wales
 Cumberland Islands (Queensland)
 Cumberland Park, South Australia, a suburb south of Adelaide
 Cumberland Land District, Tasmania
 Cumberland Plain, a biogeographical region in Sydney
 Cumberland Plain Woodland, a woodland community in Sydney

Canada
 Cumberland (Edmonton), Alberta, a neighbourhood
 Cumberland (electoral district) Federal electoral district
 Cumberland (N.W.T. electoral district)
 Cumberland (Nova Scotia electoral district)
 Cumberland (Saskatchewan provincial electoral district)
 Cumberland, British Columbia
 Cumberland, Ontario (disambiguation), three locations within the Canadian province of Ontario
 Cumberland County, Nova Scotia
 Cumberland House, Saskatchewan
 Cumberland House Provincial Park, Saskatchewan
 Cumberland Lake, Saskatchewan
 Cumberland Sound, an inlet into Baffin Island

United States

Place names by state
 Cumberland County (disambiguation), in 10 of the United States, as well as in Canada and Australia
 Cumberland, Georgia, an edge city of Atlanta, business district, and neighborhood
 Cumberland Island, in Eastern Georgia, a geographical feature and a town 
 Cumberland Island National Seashore
 Cumberland, Indiana
 Cumberland, Iowa
 Cumberland, Kentucky
 Cumberland, Maine in Cumberland County
 Cumberland Center, Maine
 Cumberland, Maryland
 Cumberland Narrows
 Cumberland Bone Cave, a fossil-filled cave, Wills Mountain, Allegany County, Maryland
 Cumberland, New Jersey
 Cumberland Head, New York
 Cumberland, Ohio
 Cumberland, Oklahoma
 Cumberland Township, Adams County, Pennsylvania
 Cumberland Township, Greene County, Pennsylvania
 Cumberland, Rhode Island, a town
 Cumberland Hill, Rhode Island, within the town
 Cumberland Gap, Tennessee, a town within Cumberland Gap National Historical Park
 Cumberland Gap National Historical Park (see also below)
 Cumberland City, Tennessee, in Stewart County on the Cumberland River
 Cumberland, Virginia in Cumberland County
 Cumberland, New Kent County, Virginia
 Cumberland (New Kent, Virginia), a historic farm property
 Cumberland, Washington
 Cumberland, Wisconsin, a city
 Cumberland, Barron County, Wisconsin, a town

Regional features
 Cumberland Gap, a pass through the Appalachian Mountains near junction of Kentucky, Virginia, and Tennessee.
 Cumberland Mountains in Tennessee and Kentucky
 Cumberland Plateau in Tennessee and Kentucky
 Cumberland River in Tennessee and Kentucky
 Cumberland Falls
 Lake Cumberland, an artificial lake on the Cumberland River
 Cumberland Road, a historical road, part of the National Road, the first US federal highway
 Cumberland Valley, in Pennsylvania and Maryland
 Cumberland Valley AVA, wine region

Other places
 Cumberland (district), a proposed district of Cumbria, England, covering a similar area to the historic county
 Cumberland, Saint Vincent and the Grenadines
 Cumberland (ward), one of the ancient divisions of the county of Cumberland, England
 Cumberland River (disambiguation)

People
 Cumberland (surname)
 Duke of Cumberland, a former and currently suspended peerage of England, Great Britain and the United Kingdom
 Earl of Cumberland, a former peerage of England

Companies
 Cumberland Drugs a defunct chain of pharmacies located in Quebec and eastern Ontario
 Cumberland Farms a chain of convenience stores found primarily in the northeastern United States
 Cumberland Records, a record label

Education
 Cumberland School of Law, in Birmingham, Alabama
 Cumberland University, in Lebanon, Tennessee
 University of the Cumberlands in Williamsburg, Kentucky

Food
 Cumberland sauce, a fruit-based sauce
 Cumberland sausage, a traditional sausage recipe in Britain

Healthcare institutions
 Cumberland Infirmary, a hospital in Carlisle
 West Cumberland Hospital, a hospital in Whitehaven

Ships
 Cumberland (ship), four merchant ships
 HMS Cumberland, eleven ships of the Royal Navy
 USS Cumberland, three ships of the United States Navy

Sports
 Cumberland (rugby league team), a team in the inaugural New South Wales Rugby League competition
 Cumberland United, an Association Football club in Adelaide, Australia

Other uses
 1964 Cumberland B-52 crash, an accident involving a nuclear bomber
 Army of the Cumberland, part of the Union Army in the American Civil War
 Cumberland Building Society, a building society
 Cumberland Presbyterian Church, a Presbyterian denomination in Protestant Christianity
 Cumberland station (disambiguation), stations of the name